Coconut water (also coconut juice) is the clear liquid inside coconuts (fruits of the coconut palm). In early development, it serves as a suspension for the endosperm of the coconut during the nuclear phase of development. As growth continues, the endosperm matures into its cellular phase and deposits into the rind of the coconut pulp. The liquid inside young coconuts is often preferred to the liquid of a ripened coconut. Coconut water from young green coconuts is also known specifically as buko juice in Philippine English.

Harvesting 
Fresh coconuts are typically harvested from the tree while they are green. A hole may be bored into the coconut to provide access to the "meat" (liquid and pulp). In young coconuts, the liquid and air may be under some pressure and may spray slightly when the inner husk is first penetrated. Coconuts that have fallen to the ground are susceptible to rot and damage from insects or other animals.

Products
Plain coconut water has long been a popular drink in tropical countries, where it is available fresh, canned, or bottled.

Coconuts for drinking are served chilled, fresh, or packaged. They are often sold by street vendors who cut them open with machetes or similar implements in front of customers. Coconut water for retail can be found in ordinary aluminum cans, Tetra Paks, glass bottles or plastic bottles, sometimes with coconut pulp or coconut jelly included.

Coconut water can be fermented to produce coconut vinegar. It is also used to make nata de coco, a jelly-like food.

Nutritional value

Providing  of food energy in a  amount, coconut water is 95% water and 4% carbohydrates, with protein and total fat content under 1% each (see the table). Coconut water contains small amounts of vitamins and dietary minerals, all under 10% of the Daily Value (DV).

Risks
One potential (but apparently quite rare) health risk arising from excessive consumption of coconut water is an overabundance of potassium in the blood (hyperkalemia), inducing acute kidney failure, heart arrhythmia, loss of consciousness and eventually death. Hyperkalemia and loss of consciousness after the consumption of several liters of coconut water were reported only as a clinical case study in association with one individual's use of a commercial product following physical exertion.

The Food and Drug Administration has identified a risk of bacterial contamination in coconut water sold as "raw".

Anecdotal sources describe coconut water being used in southern part of India for senicide, the killing of elderly people, a procedure known as thalaikoothal. In this custom, the elderly person is made to drink an excessive amount of coconut water, eventually resulting in fever and death, the exact causes of which were not determined.

Commercialization

Since the early 21st century, coconut water has been marketed in Western countries as a natural energy or sports drink having low levels of fat, carbohydrates, and calories, and significant electrolyte content.

False advertising 
Marketing claims attributing health benefits to coconut water are not based on science and are disallowed by certain regulatory agencies like the United States Food and Drug Administration which warned producers about misleading marketing claims that coconut water is antiviral, can lower cholesterol, can regulate blood glucose levels, and other false claims, as inappropriate for the product.

Some companies have faced class-action lawsuits over false advertising claims that the product was "super-hydrating", "nutrient-packed", and "mega-electrolyte". The plaintiffs also alleged that one company, Vita Coco, falsely claimed that its product had "15 times the electrolytes found in sports drinks" and misrepresented the levels of sodium and magnesium as advertised. The company denied any wrongdoing and settled the lawsuit for US$10 million in April 2012.

Medical use in Cambodia 
Although substituting coconut water for saline is not recommended by physicians today, it was a common practice during the Khmer Rouge regime in Cambodia from 1975 to 1979. The Documentation Center of Cambodia cited the practice of allowing untrained nurses to administer green coconut water during the Pol Pot regime as a crime against humanity.

See also 

 Coconut cream
 Coconut milk
 Coconut sugar
 Juicing
 List of juices
 Palm wine

References

External links 

Coconut drinks
Foods containing coconut
Fruit juice
2010s in food